Mount Morris may refer to:

Places 
In the United States:
 Mount Morris, Illinois
 Mount Morris, Michigan
 Mount Morris (New York), a mountain
 Mount Morris (town), New York
 Mount Morris (village), New York
 Mount Morris, Pennsylvania 
 Mount Morris, Wisconsin, a town
 Mount Morris (community), Wisconsin, an unincorporated community
 Mount Morris Township, Ogle County, Illinois
 Mount Morris Township, Michigan
 Mount Morris Township, Minnesota
Mount Morris (Antarctica)

People 
Mount Etna Morris (1900-1988), U.S. politician

Other 
 Mount Morris College, Illinois
 Mount Morris Dam, New York
 Mount Morris Park Historic District, Harlem, New York city